"There Was This Girl" is a song recorded by American country music singer Riley Green. It was released in June 2018 as his debut single and the first from his debut studio album, Different 'Round Here. Green wrote the song with Erik Dylan, and Dann Huff served as producer.

Content
The song is a story song about the impact that various women have had in the narrator's life. Billy Dukes of Taste of Country wrote that it "finds the narrow space between calls for a return to a more timeless country sound and seeks to banish the word "bro" from the dictionary. The debut single is smart storytelling for the everyman. The trick Green and his co-writers pull is using successive choruses to advance his narrative without sacrificing the country-rocker's singalong quality. He swaps only a word or phrase each time, slowly turning what starts as an adolescent adventure reminiscent of Chris Cagle's 'Chicks Dig It' into a grown man's memory."

Music video
Green said that the song's music video (directed by Peter Zavadil) was shot by fans of his, while he performed a concert in a bar in his home state of Alabama. He told Taste of Country that "We actually let the fans shoot the video, and literally passed the camera from fan to fan."

Green performed the song on Today on January 7, 2019.

Charts

Weekly charts

Year-end charts

Certifications

References

2018 debut singles
2018 songs
Riley Green (singer) songs
Big Machine Records singles
Song recordings produced by Dann Huff